Ya'akov Shamai (born 22 May 1940) is an Israeli farmer and former politician.

Biography
Shamai was born in Jerusalem during the Mandate era. After high school, he did national service in the IDF between 1958 and 1961, before working in agriculture.

He headed the Likud faction in the Histadrut trade union, and was on the Likud list for the 1984 Knesset elections. Although he failed to win a seat, he entered the Knesset on 5 February 1985 as a replacement for the deceased Yitzhak Seiger. He was re-elected in 1988 and 1992, before losing his seat in the 1996 elections.

His daughter, Yifat, is married to Likud MK Yariv Levin.

References

External links

1940 births
People from Jerusalem
Jews in Mandatory Palestine
Israeli trade unionists
Living people
Likud politicians
Members of the 11th Knesset (1984–1988)
Members of the 12th Knesset (1988–1992)
Members of the 13th Knesset (1992–1996)